The  occurred  at 02:00 local time on December 31 (17:00 December 30 UTC). The epicenter was near Edo, the forerunner of present-day Tokyo, in the southern part of the Kantō region, Japan. An estimated 2,300 people were killed by the shaking and subsequent fires. The earthquake triggered a major tsunami which caused many additional casualties, giving a total death toll of at least 5,233, possibly up to 10,000. Genroku is a Japanese era spanning from 1688 through 1704.

Tectonic setting
The Kantō Region lies at the complex triple junction, where the convergent boundaries between the subducting Pacific and Philippine Sea Plates and the overriding North American and Eurasian Plates meet. Earthquakes with epicenters in the Kanto region may occur within the Eurasian Plate, at the Eurasian Plate/Philippine Sea Plate interface, within the Philippine Sea Plate, at the Philippine Sea Plate/Pacific Plate interface or within the Pacific Plate. The 1703 earthquake is thought to have involved rupture of the interface between the Eurasian Plate and the Philippine Sea Plate.

Earthquake
The earthquake was associated with areas of both uplift and subsidence. This distribution of uplift, coupled with modelling of the tsunami, indicate that at least two and probably three fault segments ruptured during the earthquake.

Tsunami

Damage
The area of greatest damage due to the earthquake shaking was in Kanagawa Prefecture, although Shizuoka Prefecture was also affected. The earthquake caused many large fires, particularly at Odawara, increasing both the degree of damage and the number of deaths. A total of 8,007 houses were destroyed by the shaking and a further 563 houses by the fires, causing 2,291 deaths. About  of coastline was severely affected by the tsunami, with deaths being caused from Shimoda on the east coast of the Izu Peninsula in the west to Isumi on the east side of the Bōsō Peninsula to the east. The total number of casualties from earthquake, fires and tsunami has been reported as 5,233. Other estimates are higher, with 10,000 in total, and one source that gives 200,000.

See also
 List of earthquakes in Japan
 List of historical earthquakes

References

External links
Seismological Society of Japan 番号 129

Megathrust earthquakes in Japan
Tsunamis in Japan
Genroku earthquake
Genroku
1703 tsunamis
Earthquakes of the Edo period
1703 disasters in Asia
18th-century disasters in Japan